Stoltzfus is a surname of German origin. It is common among Mennonites and Amish.  Most American Stoltzfuses are descended from Nicholas Stoltzfus (1719–1774), an Amish man who migrated from Germany to America in 1766.

Notable people
Notable people with this surname include:
 Gene Stoltzfus (1940–2010), American peace activist
 J. Lowell Stoltzfus (born 1949), American politician
 Kate Stoltzfus (born 1991), American model
 Nathan Stoltzfus (born 1954), American historian
 William Stoltzfus (born 1924), American diplomat
 Elam Stoltzfus (born 1957), American documentary filmmaker